"Armed & Dangerous" is a song by American rapper King Von. It was released on October 31, 2020, as an extract from Von's debut studio album Welcome to O'Block (2020).
The song was produced by Chopsquad DJ.

Composition 
In the song, Von raps with refined storytelling technique about 2011-2014 period, spelling about going at war with opps, he also mentions Chief Keef and how he fostered the popularity of OBlock and how he made war with the GDs mainstream, favoring 
consequently the rise of the musical genre. He also speaks about his uncle, how he was crucial in its growth and how he died.
The beat is a drill instrumental with the particularity of having kicks suppressed.

Music video 
The music video was released on January 11, 2021. It was directed by Jerry Productions, and finds King Von in various locations, from a "white" neighborhood to the cell where he stood to a basketball court where he played inside the prison.

It reached over 1.7 millions views in less than one day on youtube

Certifications

References 

2020 singles
2020 songs
Empire Distribution singles
King Von songs
Lil Durk songs
Songs written by Lil Durk